Lee Chak Men (born 1922) was a Singaporean basketball player. He competed in the men's tournament at the 1956 Summer Olympics.

References

External links
 

1922 births
Possibly living people
Singaporean men's basketball players
Olympic basketball players of Singapore
Basketball players at the 1956 Summer Olympics
Singaporean sportspeople of Chinese descent
Place of birth missing (living people)